The 2019 European Cricket League (abbreviated as ECL19) was the inaugural edition of the European Cricket League. It was held in July 2019 with eight European champion club teams. At ECL19, the domestic club champions of Denmark, France, Germany, Italy, the Netherlands, Romania, Russia and Spain all competed for the chance to become club cricket's European champions. Players from 18 European nations as well as from more traditional cricket-playing nations took part. The league has adopted the T10 format and was played over three days. The La Manga Club in Cartagena, Murcia, Spain hosted the tournament, which was staged between July 29 and July 31, 2019.

Tournament Play / Broadcast at ECL19 
Packing 17 matches into a T10 format over three days, every match was televised live in Europe, Asia, North America and Australasia across a combination of broadcast, digital and social channels, including the newly-launched European Cricket Network. Over 100 countries worldwide broadcast coverage including the UK, Australia, India, Middle East, UAE, France, Germany, Turkey, Spain, United States, Canada and the Caribbean. Teams were split into two groups of four with matches being played on a round-robin basis in La Manga with the top two from each progressing to contest the semi-finals and final.

The current ECL title holders are V.O.C Rotterdam of the Netherlands, who won the inaugural 2019 season, beating SG Findorff (Bremen) from Germany in the final.

Participating teams

Eight clubs from across Europe participated in the inaugural edition.

  Svanholm Cricket Club, Brøndby
  Dreux Cricket Club, Dreux
  Sportgemeinschaft Findorff, Bremen
  Janjua Cricket Club, Brescia
  Volharding Olympia Combinatie, Rotterdam
  Cluj Cricket Club, Cluj-Napoca
  St. Petersburg Lions, Saint Petersburg
  Catalunya Cricket Club, Girona

Group stage

Group A

 V.O.C. Rotterdam won the toss and elected to bowl.

 Dreux CC won the toss and elected to bat.

 V.O.C. Rotterdam won the toss and elected to bowl.

 Cluj CC won the toss and elected to bowl.

 Svanholm CC won the toss and elected to bowl.

 Svanholm CC won the toss and elected to bowl.

Group B 

 Lost all points due to player eligibility infringement.

 Catalunya CC won the toss and elected to bat.

 Catalunya CC won the toss and elected to bat.
 JCC Brescia initially won all their matches, but were later found breaching the player eligibility criteria and thus their opponents were declared winners.

 JCC Brescia won the toss and elected to bowl.
 JCC Brescia initially won all their matches, but were later found breaching the player eligibility criteria and thus their opponents were declared winners.

 St. Petersburg Lions won the toss and elected to bat.

 
 St. Petersburg Lions won the toss and elected to bowl.
 JCC Brescia initially won all their matches, but were later found breaching the player eligibility criteria and thus their opponents were declared winners.

 SG Findorff won the toss and elected to bowl.

Minor play-offs

7th place playoff 

 Cluj CC won the toss and elected to bat.

5th place playoff 

 Dreux CC won the toss and elected to bat.

Semi-finals

1st Semi-final

 Catalunya CC won the toss and elected to bat.

2nd Semi-final

 SG Findorff won the toss and elected to bowl.

Final

 SG Findorff won the toss and elected to bowl.

Player of the Tournament 
Max O'Dowd of V.O.C. Rotterdam was awarded “Player of the Tournament” at the 2019 European Cricket League. O’Dowd scored 219 runs in five innings (2 not outs) at an average of 73 and strike rate of 263.86, including an undefeated 74 in the final against SG Findorff. He also took four wickets in the tournament with his leg-break bowling with a best of 2-25 against Catalunya Cricket Club in the semi-final. O’Dowd is a current Netherlands international.

Pavel Florin at ECL19 
The inaugural tournament gained significant worldwide prominence after the remarkable performances of Cluj all-rounder Pavel Florin during the group stages. Florin, a 40-year-old professional bodyguard and president of Cluj Cricket Club in Romania, caused a stir after his bowling performance went viral on social media. Many of the sport's most famous figures, including Australian legend Shane Warne, expressed their support and admiration of Florin because of his pure unaffected love for the game. Florin has since gone on to play in Australia where he again hit the headlines over the winter. Florin will take part in the second-staging of the European Cricket League - ECL20 - with Cluj Cricket Club, Romania.

References

Cricket leagues
Cricket
European Cricket League